Eccleston is a civil parish in the Borough of Chorley, Lancashire, England.  The parish contains 16 buildings that are recorded in the National Heritage List for England as designated listed buildings. Of these, three are listed at Grade II*, the middle grade, and the others are at Grade II, the lowest grade.  The parish contains the village of Eccleston, which is surrounded by agricultural land.  Most of the listed buildings are houses, farmhouses (or houses that originated as farmhouses), and farm buildings.  The other listed buildings are the parish church and structures in its churchyard, a public house, a former school, a bridge, and a former savings bank.

Key

Buildings

References

Citations

Sources

Lists of listed buildings in Lancashire
Buildings and structures in the Borough of Chorley